Corynocera is a genus of European non-biting midges in the subfamily Chironominae of the bloodworm family Chironomidae.

Species
C. ambigua Zetterstedt, 1837
C. oliveri Lindeberg, 1970

References

Chironomidae
Nematocera genera